

The Hansa-Brandenburg W.16 was a floatplane fighter built in Germany during World War I for the Imperial German Navy.

Design and development
The W.16 was a single-seat hydroplane fighter made from wood and fabric. The first prototype flew in February 1917, but the aircraft did not enter production due to the Imperial German Navy losing interest in the floatplane fighter concept.

Specifications (W.16)

References

Bibliography

1910s German fighter aircraft
W.16
Floatplanes
Biplanes
Rotary-engined aircraft
Aircraft first flown in 1917